Gentiana prostrata is a rare species of gentian known by the common name pygmy gentian.

It is native to Eurasia and to western North America from Alaska and northern Canada to Colorado and California. It is a resident of moist areas in the high mountains.

Description
This is an annual herb reaching only a few centimeters tall. The leaves are generally oval-shaped and up to about six millimeters long. They are green and sometimes edged in dull white. The solitary flower is about a centimeter wide at the mouth, with triangular or diamond-shaped lobes in shades of deep blue to purple. Between each lobe of the corolla is a sinus appendage with jagged, thready tips. The fruit is a capsule containing wingless seeds.

External links
Jepson Manual Treatment
Photo gallery

prostrata
Flora of the Northwestern United States
Flora of Northern Canada
Flora of Western Canada
Flora of Alaska
Flora of California
Flora of Colorado
Flora of Wyoming
Flora of the Cascade Range
Flora of the Rocky Mountains
Flora of the Sierra Nevada (United States)
Flora without expected TNC conservation status